The Best of Depeche Mode Volume 1 is a greatest hits album by English electronic music band Depeche Mode, released on 8 November 2006 by Mute Records. The album consists of select Depeche Mode singles from their then-25-year career, as well as the previously unreleased track "Martyr"—recorded during the Playing the Angel sessions—which was released as a single in late October 2006.

The album has sold over one million copies in Europe alone and has been awarded the IFPI Platinum Europe Award.

Track listing
 "Personal Jesus" – 3:47 (Violator, 1990)
 "Just Can't Get Enough" – 3:43 (Speak & Spell, 1981)
 "Everything Counts" – 4:01 (Construction Time Again, 1983)
 "Enjoy the Silence" – 4:15 (Violator)
 "Shake the Disease" – 4:52 (The Singles 81>85, 1985)
 "See You" – 3:58 (A Broken Frame, 1982)
 "It's No Good" – 5:59 (Ultra, 1997)
 "Strangelove" – 3:47 (Music for the Masses, 1987)
 "Suffer Well" – 3:53 (Playing the Angel, 2005)
 "Dream On" – 3:42 (Exciter, 2001)
 "People Are People" – 3:46 (Some Great Reward, 1984)
 "Martyr" – 3:25 (previously unreleased)
 "Walking in My Shoes" – 5:01 (Songs of Faith and Devotion, 1993)
 "I Feel You" – 4:35 (Songs of Faith and Devotion)
 "Precious" – 4:09 (Playing the Angel)
 "Master and Servant" – 3:49 (Some Great Reward)
 "New Life" – 3:46 (Speak & Spell)
 "Never Let Me Down Again" – 4:18 (Music for the Masses)

iTunes Store bonus tracks
"Personal Jesus" (Boys Noize Rework) – 6:55
"Never Let Me Down Again" (Digitalism Remix) – 4:40
"Everything Counts" (Oliver Huntemann & Stephan Bodzin Dub) – 6:55
"People Are People" (Underground Resistance Assault DJ 3000 Remix) – 7:24
"Personal Jesus" (Heartthrob Rework 2) – 5:15

Special edition bonus DVD
Limited edition copies of The Best of Depeche Mode Volume 1 (LCDMUTEL15) include a bonus DVD of music videos. A few of the videos feature songs that were not on The Best of Depeche Mode Volume 1 and a few of the songs on the album are not on the DVD. The cover art has a pink flower rather than the white flower depicted on the cover of the regular CD.

The electronic press kit (EPK) contains commentary on all the singles that made it onto the CD release of The Best of Depeche Mode Volume 1.

On 16 March 2007, the DVD was released on its own as The Best of Videos Volume 1.

Track listing
 "Just Can't Get Enough" – Directed by Clive Richardson*
 "Everything Counts" – (Directed by Clive Richardson)*
 "People Are People" – (Directed by Clive Richardson)**
 "Master & Servant – (Directed by Clive Richardson)*
 "Shake the Disease" – (Directed by Peter Care)*
 "Stripped" – (Directed by Peter Care)
 "A Question of Time" – (Directed by Anton Corbijn)
 "Strangelove" (1987 version) – (Directed by Anton Corbijn)
 "Never Let Me Down Again" – (Directed by Anton Corbijn)
 "Behind the Wheel" (Remix) – (Directed by Anton Corbijn)
 "Personal Jesus" – (Directed by Anton Corbijn)
 "Enjoy the Silence" – (Directed by Anton Corbijn)
 "I Feel You" – (Directed by Anton Corbijn)
 "Walking in My Shoes" – (Directed by Anton Corbijn)
 "In Your Room" – (Directed by Anton Corbijn)
 "Barrel of a Gun" – (Directed by Anton Corbijn)
 "It's No Good" – (Directed by Anton Corbijn)
 "Only When I Lose Myself" – (Directed by Brian Griffin)
 "Dream On" – (Directed by Stéphane Sednaoui)**
 "I Feel Loved" – (Directed by John Hillcoat)**
 "Enjoy the Silence '04 – (Directed by Uwe Flade)**
 "Precious" – (Directed by Uwe Flade)
 "Suffer Well" – (Directed by Anton Corbijn)
 The Best of: Volume 1: A short film
* First official release on DVD
** First official release period ("People Are People"'s regular video was not used in the original Some Great Videos release. None of the Exciter videos (or "Enjoy the Silence 04") were publicly released prior to Best of)

Personnel

Depeche Mode
 Dave Gahan – lead vocals, sampler
 Martin Gore – guitar (except "Just Can't Get Enough", "Everything Counts", "Shake the Disease", "See You", "Dream On", "People Are People", "Master and Servant" and "New Life"), keyboard, acoustic guitar ("Dream On", "People Are People"), bass ("Suffer Well"), melodica ("Everything Counts"), backing vocals, sampler
 Andy Fletcher – keyboard, sampler, backing vocals
 Alan Wilder – keyboard (except "Just Can't Get Enough", "See You", "It's No Good", "Suffer Well", "Dream On", "Martyr", "Precious" and "New Life"), backing vocals (except "Just Can't Get Enough", "See You", "It's No Good", "Suffer Well", "Dream On", "Martyr", "Precious" and "New Life"), drum machine (except "Personal Jesus", "Just Can't Get Enough", "See You", "It's No Good", "Suffer Well", "Dream On", "Martyr", "I Feel You", "Precious" and "New Life"), electronic drum ("Personal Jesus"), drums ("I Feel You"), bass ("Walking in My Shoes"), sampler
 Vince Clarke – keyboard, drum machine and backing vocals ("Just Can't Get Enough" and "New Life")

Other Musicians
 Victor Indrizzo – percussion ("It's No Good")
 Mark Bell – keyboard and drum machine ("Dream On")

Charts

Weekly charts

Year-end charts

Certifications

Release history

References

External links
 Album information from the official Depeche Mode website
 Depeche Mode: The Best Of, Volume 1 – official album microsite

2006 greatest hits albums
2006 video albums
Albums produced by Daniel Miller (music producer)
Albums produced by Flood (producer)
Albums produced by Mark Bell (British musician)
Albums produced by Tim Simenon
Depeche Mode compilation albums
Depeche Mode video albums
Music video compilation albums
Mute Records compilation albums
Mute Records video albums
Reprise Records compilation albums
Reprise Records video albums
Sire Records compilation albums
Sire Records video albums